Syllophopsis is a genus of ants belonging to the family Formicidae.

The species of this genus are found in Southern Hemisphere (except Southern America).

Species
Species:

Syllophopsis adiastolon
Syllophopsis australica 
Syllophopsis ferodens
Syllophopsis fisheri
Syllophopsis gongromos
Syllophopsis hildebrandti 
Syllophopsis infusca
Syllophopsis modesta
Syllophopsis saudiensis

References

Ants
Ant genera